Sciapodinae is a subfamily of flies in the family Dolichopodidae.

Genera
 Tribe Mesorhagini Bickel, 1994
 Amesorhaga Bickel, 1994
 Mesorhaga Schiner, 1868
 Negrobovia Bickel, 1994
 Tribe Sciapodini Becker, 1917
 Bickelia Grichanov, 1996
 Condylostylus Bigot, 1859
 Dytomyia Bickel, 1994
 Helixocerus Lamb, 1929
 Mascaromyia Bickel, 1994
 Narrabeenia Bickel, 1994
 Naufraga Bickel, 1992
 Pilbara Bickel, 1994
 Sciapus Zeller, 1842
 Sinosciapus Yang, 2001
 Tribe Chrysosomatini Becker, 1918
 Abbemyia Bickel, 1994
 Amblypsilopus Bigot, 1889
 Austrosciapus Bickel, 1994
 Bickeliolus Grichanov, 1996
 Chrysosoma Guérin-Méneville, 1831
 Ethiosciapus Bickel, 1994
 Gigantosciapus Grichanov, 1997
 Heteropsilopus Bigot, 1859
 Krakatauia Enderlein, 1912
 Lapita Bickel, 2002
 Parentia Hardy, 1935
 Plagiozopelma Enderlein, 1912
 Pseudoparentia Bickel, 1994
 Pouebo Bickel, 2008
 †Wheelerenomyia Meunier, 1907

References 

 
Dolichopodidae subfamilies